Creature is the debut studio album by American metalcore band Within the Ruins. It was released on February 17, 2009 through Victory Records. It is their only studio album to feature Jon Grande on vocals. Additionally, it is their only studio album to feature Kyle Marcoux on guitar, and also Madison Roseberry on bass. The album features a distinctly different sound than the established sound the band would reveal on their sophomore release Invade.

The album saw the creation of the band's first music video, recorded for the song "Extinguish Them" and published to the band's YouTube channel on October 2, 2011.

Background and recording 
Creature was recorded between November 10, 2008 and January 2, 2009 at Zing Recording Studios in Within the Ruins' hometown of Westfield, Massachusetts. Zing had previously produced highly acclaimed metalcore albums by renowned metal bands such as Unearth's The Oncoming Storm, August Burns Red's debut Thrill Seeker, several Killswitch Engage albums, and Shadows Fall's Somber Eyes to the Sky. The band would return to Zing to engineer the vocals on their 2017 release Halfway Human.

Critical reception 
Creature was ranked 53rd by Metal Injection readers in the blog's end-of-year "Best Albums of 2009" poll.

Track listing

Personnel
Within the Ruins
 Jon Grande – vocals
 Joe Cocchi – guitars, production
 Kyle Marcoux – guitars
 Madison Roseberry – bass
 Kevin McGuill – drums

Additional personnel
 Eric Arena – production, engineering, mixing
 Jim Fogarty – engineering, piano
 Jay Deluca and Maria Rice – engineering
 Jeff Lipton – remastering
 Godmachine – design, artwork
 Doublej – layout
 Jeremy Saffer – photography

References 

2009 debut albums
Within the Ruins albums
Victory Records albums